The Somali Division 2 is the second football division in Somalia. 
The league is contested by 08* clubs, was up dated 2015.

Clubs
As of 2013-14 season:
Albeder
Badbaado
Banaadir Telecom FC
Dahabshiil
D.B.G.
Gantaalaha Afgooye
Sahafi FC
Somali Fruit

See also
Somali Division 3

References

Football leagues in Somalia
Second level football leagues in Africa